Emanuel Perathoner (born 12 May 1986) is an Italian snowboarder. He competed in the 2018 Winter Olympics.

He participated at the FIS Freestyle Ski and Snowboarding World Championships 2019, winning a medal.

References

External links

1986 births
Living people
Snowboarders at the 2018 Winter Olympics
Italian male snowboarders
Olympic snowboarders of Italy
Sportspeople from Bolzano
Ladin people
21st-century Italian people